Mah Kariz (also Romanized as Māh Kārīz; also known as Meh Kārīz) is a village in Sang Bast Rural District, in the Central District of Fariman County, Razavi Khorasan Province, Iran. At the 2006 census, its population was 154, in 43 families.

References 

Populated places in Fariman County